In Pursuit of the 27th Man is an album by jazz pianist Horace Silver released on the Blue Note label in 1973, featuring performances by Silver with David Friedman, Randy Brecker, Michael Brecker, Bob Cranshaw, and Mickey Roker.

Reception
The Allmusic review by Scott Yanow awarded the album 4 stars and describes it as "a very unusual sound for a Horace Silver set. But no matter what the instrumentation, the style is pure Silver, hard-driving and melodic hard bop with a strong dose of funky soul".

Track listing
All compositions by Horace Silver except where noted
 "Liberated Brother" (Irvine) - 5:23
 "Kathy" (Evans, Livingston, Santos) - 4:17
 "Gregory Is Here" - 6:21
 "Summer in Central Park" - 4:41
 "Nothin' Can Stop Me Now" - 5:15
 "In Pursuit of the 27th Man" - 9:44
 "Strange Vibes" - 5:02
Recorded on October 6 (2, 4, 6 & 7) and November 10 (1, 3 & 5), 1972.

Personnel
Horace Silver - piano
Randy Brecker - trumpet, flugelhorn (1, 3 & 5)
Michael Brecker - tenor saxophone (1, 3 & 5)
David Friedman - vibes (2, 4, 6 & 7)
Bob Cranshaw - electric bass
Mickey Roker - drums

References

Horace Silver albums
1973 albums
Blue Note Records albums
Albums produced by George Butler (record producer)
Albums recorded at Van Gelder Studio